Rosser International was an architectural and engineering firm formed from the acquisition of FABRAP by the Atlanta engineering firm Rosser White Hobbs Davidson McClellan Kelly. The firm ceased operations around June 2019.

Buildings
Memphis Pyramid
 AT&T Midtown Center
 Turner Field
 Arena at Gwinnett Center
 Petersen Events Center
 Verizon Arena
 United Spirit Arena
 Rhoads Stadium
 Joan C. Edwards Stadium
 Bud Walton Arena
 Colonial Life Arena

References

Architecture firms based in Georgia (U.S. state)
Companies based in Atlanta